is a Japanese professional stock car racing driver. He competes part-time in the NASCAR Craftsman Truck Series, driving the No. 46 Toyota Tundra for G2G Racing. He has also competed in the NASCAR Xfinity Series and NASCAR K&N Pro Series East in the past.

Racing career

Early years
Ogata started motocross racing in Japan in 1987, winning 30 feature races. He eventually switched to dirt track racing, racing quarter midgets, and won at Twin Ring Motegi. In 2003, Ogata started racing in the NASCAR Whelen All-American Series Late Model Stock, and has participated in races at Concord Motorsports Park. In 2009, Ogata signed a deal with ENEOS to sponsor his Whelen All-American Series ride, the company's first NASCAR sponsorship.

K&N Pro Series
Ogata made his K&N Pro Series East debut in 2012 in Jennifer McDonald's No. 49 Dodge at Gresham Motorsports Park, finishing 15th. He competed in three more events with McDonald during the year, this time in a Toyota, crashing in two of them. In 2013, Ogata ran with Sherry Kuykendall's No. 44 and Ronald Faison's No. 39, three of which were with the former, and failed to qualify in the No. 44 at Dover International Speedway. The following year, Ogata competed as an owner/driver in the No. 56 Toyota with Dale Quarterley as crew chief, qualifying in three of five races, but only finished the race at Iowa Speedway.

Truck Series
On 5 November 2014, Win-Tron Racing announced Ogata would make his Camping World Truck Series debut with the team in the No. 35 Toyota, racing in the Lucas Oil 150 at Phoenix International Raceway; this also marked his first career race at Phoenix. Partnering with MB Motorsports for 2015, Ogata ran three races, scoring his first top twenty finish (18th). His only race in 2016 was with MB, but after a crash with Josh Wise early in the UNOH 175, Ogata finished 31st.

Ogata returned to the Truck Series in July 2020, driving the No. 33 Toyota for Reaume Brothers Racing at Texas Motor Speedway. He remained with the team for the 2021 season. At Darlington, he was involved in a very serious crash with Timmy Hill and Tanner Gray. He returned in 2022 to drive the No. 43 for Reaume Brothers Racing at Darlington.

Xfinity Series
On 31 October 2018, Ogata announced his NASCAR Xfinity Series debut, which would come nearly two weeks later in the Whelen Trusted to Perform 200 at ISM Raceway, driving the No. 66 Toyota Camry for MBM Motorsports.

In 2021, Ogata would make 1 start in both the No. 52 for Jimmy Means Racing and the No. 78 for B. J. McLeod Motorsports. In 2022, he would return to MBM to drive their No. 13 car in the races at New Hampshire and Texas in September.

Personal life
On 21 December 2016, a thief broke into Ogata's garage, stealing his pickup truck as well as a Legends car for Ogata's son, Ryo. The value of the items taken was around US $80,000.

Motorsports career results

NASCAR
(key) (Bold – Pole position awarded by qualifying time. Italics – Pole position earned by points standings or practice time. * – Most laps led.)

Xfinity Series

Craftsman Truck Series

 Season still in progress 
 Ineligible for series points

K&N Pro Series East

References

External links
 
 

1973 births
Living people
Japanese racing drivers
NASCAR drivers
Sportspeople from Yokohama